Robert Alexander Hefner ("The Judge"), born in Hunt County, Texas, to William Lafayette Hefner and Sarah Jane Masters Hefner, was a lawyer-turned-politician. He served as mayor of Ardmore, Oklahoma, and of Oklahoma City, and as a justice of the Supreme Court of Oklahoma. He is notable as the originator of the mineral transfer deed known as the Hefner Form, which is still used at present. Hefner was inducted into the Oklahoma Hall of Fame in 1949.

Hefner also became notable because of his work in government, especially in Ardmore and later in Oklahoma City. Although his official title in Ardmore was mayor, locals soon gave him the nickname, "The Judge," apparently because he was so skillful in resolving disagreements and getting unlikely allies to support community actions, such as creating the city's water supply. In Oklahoma City, he initiated a municipal water supply system that still serves the much-expanded city at present.

Early life

Growing up in poverty, self-teaching was the only education Hefner could afford. By the age of 21, he had received only nine months of formal education, primarily from books received from a cousin at College Station which he read "at night while I was working on the farm and also when I was out herding sheep".

In 1895, the family had to sell the farm to pay off debts, though the proceeds were insufficient to settle them in full. Just after Hefner's 21st birthday, his father died. Hefner then resolved to work the farm for the following year to clear the family debts. He received $15 per month credited against the debt, and studied at night under a kerosene lamp given to him by his father in the hope of passing the entrance exams for college. In 1896, Hefner passed the examination and gained entrance to North Texas Baptist College at Jacksboro. Hefner then taught school before entering the University of Texas Law School in 1899. He paid off the remaining family debts.

Hefner went to college with only the clothes on his back and 35 cents, but found work splitting wood to pay his way. At Jacksboro, he met his wife, Eva Johnson, daughter of a banker. She spoke four languages fluently and became valedictorian of Baylor University in 1905, after gaining her third degree. On graduation, he decided he would study law at the University of Texas in Austin, but once again found funding to be a problem. As a result, he worked for a while to save up enough to pay his way and, at the age of 25, he enrolled at the University of Texas and found himself only the second student from the "South Prairie" to do so. In 1902, he graduated near the top of his law class.

The boom
Following his graduation, Hefner headed to Beaumont. It seemed all Texas had heard of the Hamill brothers' gusher which gained Beaumont the title "Oil Capital of the World" for a short time. Hefner decided to specialize in oil and gas law, and to save his money to invest in land that one day might produce. He found a partner, and opened Parker and Hefner. They landed the Southern Pacific Railroad account for their division just seven years after Hefner arrived in Austin. The workload was so great that they had to hire a third partner, renaming the firm Parker, Hefner and Organ.

Throughout his time in Beaumont, Hefner was educating himself further in the oil and gas industry—he became fascinated with geology (or "creekology" as he called it.) It was also during this time that Eva graduated from Baylor University and the two were married on July 18, 1906. They decided to move to Ardmore, Oklahoma, after being involved in a Choctaw court case which dealt specifically with the Dawes Act and Indian mineral conveyances to non-Indians. The account states that Hefner worked for four Indian families, helping them to get their land allotment. He was paid for this work with an annual interest in future profits from the mineral rights, making Hefner quite wealthy.

Although it is not clear when Hefner actually moved to Ardmore with his family, he had become a resident of Ardmore by January 1, 1908. He founded the Hefner Company, and became an expert in legal issues related to the rapidly-developing oil and gas industry. He immersed himself in community affairs and was made president of the local school board from 1910 to 1920. He also served as city attorney from 1911 to 1913 and city mayor from 1919 to 1927.  He represented most of the major oil companies and leading independents including: Humble Oil & Refining Company, Magnolia Petroleum Company (Mobil Oil), Pure Oil Company, Gulf Oil Company, Carter Oil, Skelly Oil, F.W. Merrick, and many others during his first few years in town.

Creekology
Hefner used his law earnings to purchase mineral rights where he thought oil and gas might one day be produced, based upon his "creekology". The theory was that because oil is lighter than water, it had been forced uphill in permeable formations and become trapped in subsurface highs, or domes. Surface water runs downhill, so oil should be traced by observing the course of the rivers and streams. It was assumed that subsurface highs correlated to surface highs. In Oklahoma, this trend was in a northwest-southeast direction from Ardmore and also in a northwest-southeast direction from Duncan.

Mineral conveyance
During his time in Ardmore, there was much debate about whether mineral rights could be conveyed separately from fee-simple title–"an opinion held by many noted professors of law and the authors of textbooks on oil-and-gas law". About 1912, shortly after the emergence of the Healdton and Cushing oil fields, Hefner prepared the first mineral deed in which he challenged conventional thinking and severed the minerals from their surface counterparts, a form that became known as "the Hefner Form". He soon began receiving requests for copies of his form from "states as far away as Pennsylvania," and it quickly became widely accepted throughout the United States until it was recognized by law. The "JZ" form of mineral conveyance in current use today, and approved by the Mid-Continent Royalty Owners Association, is based on the original Robert A Hefner Form.

Another challenge came from a New York investor named W.L. Hernstadt in 1934. Hefner supported the theory, but told Hernstadt that it would come long after their time. Hernstadt offered Hefner $10 per net mineral acre for his properties in Carter County and Hefner accepted, a decision that his son would later mock. It was Hefner's grandson, Robert A. Hefner III, who would pioneer gas production at depths approaching  in the Anadarko Basin of western Oklahoma during the late 1970s.

Work in government
Hefner served two years as city attorney in Ardmore and was elected to the Board of Education as President in 1911 – a position he held until 1918.

Hefner was elected Mayor of Ardmore in 1920, a position he held for six years. Under his lead, Ardmore overcame a 1919 deficit of $9,000 to a surplus of $193,000 in 1926 when he stepped down. In 1922 a $300,000 bond was also issued for Hickory Creek Reservoir, creating a water supply for Ardmore. As Mayor of Ardmore, Hefner also gave the first speech ever broadcast from the city over the radio.

Shortly after his move to Ardmore in 1907–1908, Hefner became known as "the Judge". In 1926, he was asked to run for the Supreme Court of Oklahoma's Fifth District. He was elected in 1927, despite widespread corruption within the court. In 1929, three members of the court were impeached for bribery, coercion, misquotation of facts, conspiracy, corruption, interference with criminal proceedings and incompetency; they were all acquitted. In his six years as a Supreme Court Justice, Hefner authored 504 opinions.

Other organizations he ardently supported include:
 the Boy Scouts of America—which he served as a member of the executive council
 the Rotary Club—of which he was President, presiding in 1923 over the National Rotary Club Convention with over 1,500 delegates
 the First Baptist Church—in which he was a deacon
 the Dad's Association at the University of Oklahoma—of which he was President
 the Beaux Arts Ball—of which he was the first King
 the Navy League—of which he was Vice-President in Oklahoma
 the Freemasons—in which he was at the thirty-second degree, as well as being deputy for the Grand Council in the District of Oklahoma.

Mayor of Oklahoma City and Lake Hefner
In 1926, Hefner moved the family to Oklahoma City, where he would become mayor in April 1939. This was the last public office he would hold.

The first of the major hurdles he faced in Oklahoma City was in securing its water supply. On October 18, 1945, the city council voted unanimously to name a reservoir Lake Hefner.

During the war, Hefner played his part. The ship was commissioned on December 8, 1942, after one month of fundraising. With the help of E.K. Gaylord, Virgil Brown and H.E. Bailey, he negotiated with Army officials in an effort to have Washington DC locate a new air depot in Oklahoma City, rather than in any of the other four cities under consideration. The three officials the Army sent were General Dwight D. Eisenhower, Robert P. Patterson and Admiral Chester W. Nimitz. In May 1941, the chief of engineers of the United States Army named the base the Midwest Air Depot (now called Tinker Air Force Base.)

Hefner was re-elected in 1942 without any opposition and served out that term before finally stepping down in 1947.

Notes

References

Bibliography
 
 
 
  
 Daniel Hefner's War of 1812 muster roll record
 Bounty land application of Elizabeth Hefner, dated 28 April 1852, Cherokee County, Alabama; from the National Archives
 Bounty land application of Elizabeth Hefner, dated 8 January 1856, Hunt County, Texas; from the National Archives
 1800 federal census of Lincoln County, North Carolina
 1810-1820-1830-1840 federal censuses of Buncombe County, North Carolina
 1840 federal census of Rabun County, Georgia
 1840-1850 federal censuses of Gilmer County, Georgia
 1850 federal census of Cherokee County, Alabama
 1860 federal census of Dekalb County, Alabama
 1870-1880 federal census of Colbert County, Alabama
 1850 federal census of Titus County, Texas
 1860-1870-1880 federal censuses of Hunt County, Texas

External links
 Encyclopedia of Oklahoma History and Culture - Hefner, Robert A.
 Oklahoma Hall of Fame

People from Hunt County, Texas
People from Ardmore, Oklahoma
Lawyers from Oklahoma City
People from Beaumont, Texas
1874 births
1971 deaths
Mayors of Oklahoma City
Justices of the Oklahoma Supreme Court